"America Will Always Stand" is a song written and originally recorded by Randy Travis in 2001, in commemoration of the 9-11 attacks on the United States.

The song charted on both the US Pop and Country charts during the fall of 2001 and winter of 2002.

All proceeds from the sales of the song benefitted the American Red Cross.

Chart history

References

External links
 

2001 songs
2001 singles
Randy Travis songs
Relentless Records singles
American patriotic songs